Samuel Leonard Shannon,  (June 1, 1816 – January 7, 1895) was a lawyer, judge and political figure in Nova Scotia, Canada. He represented Halifax County in the Nova Scotia House of Assembly from 1859 to 1867.

He was born in Halifax, the son of James Noble Shannon, a city merchant, and Nancy Allison. Shannon was educated at King's College. He articled in law with Henry Pryor and was called to the bar in 1839. In 1855, he married Annie Starr Fellows. Shannon served in the local militia, reaching the rank of lieutenant-colonel. In 1858, he was named a Nova Scotia railway board commissioner. Shannon was named Queen's Counsel in 1864. He served as a minister without portfolio in the province's Executive Council from 1863 to 1867. He supported the development of an intercolonial railway, free common schools and Confederation. Shannon served on the board of governors for Dalhousie College and helped establish the Dalhousie Law School, serving as one of its first instructors. In 1881, he was named probate judge for Halifax County. Shannon died in Halifax at the age of 78.

His daughter Kate's diary of 1892 was published in 1994 as a souvenir of the epoch: “A Victorian Lady’s Album: Kate Shannon’s Halifax and Boston Diary of 1892” (edited by D. Stanley; Halifax and Boston: Formac Publishing Company).

References 

1816 births
1895 deaths
Nova Scotia pre-Confederation MLAs
Judges in Nova Scotia
Canadian Methodists
Canadian King's Counsel